The Kansas City Southern Depot in Vivian, Louisiana was listed on the National Register of Historic Places in 1995.

It is a one-story brownish-red brick building with Craftsman influence that was built in 1921.

The building is now home to the Vivian Railroad Station Museum and is operated by the Historical Society of North Caddo.  The museum features railroad artifacts, photos, and displays about North Caddo Parish history.

See also
National Register of Historic Places listings in Caddo Parish, Louisiana

References

External links

 Vivian Railroad Station Museum - official site

Railway stations on the National Register of Historic Places in Louisiana
Kansas City Southern Railway stations
Railway stations in the United States opened in 1921

National Register of Historic Places in Caddo Parish, Louisiana
1921 establishments in Louisiana
Former railway stations in Louisiana